Cyanopepla micans is a moth of the subfamily Arctiinae. It was described by Gottlieb August Wilhelm Herrich-Schäffer in 1854. It is found in Colombia and Venezuela.

References

Cyanopepla
Moths described in 1854